St. Mary's Episcopal Church, at 1307 Holmes Street in downtown Kansas City, Missouri, is an Episcopal church in the Anglo-Catholic tradition.  It is part of the Diocese of West Missouri.

St. Mary's was the first Episcopal church in Kansas City, established in 1857. The parish was founded as St. Luke's, and the name changed in the 1870s. It was sponsored by Trinity Episcopal Church in Independence, Missouri.  Prior to the construction of the building at 13th and Holmes, the congregation worshiped at several locations including a building at 8th and Walnut.

The current Holmes Street building was built in 1887. The Gothic Revival church was accepted into the National Register of Historic Places in 1978.

Gallery

References

External links

Official website: St. Mary's Episcopal Church

Churches on the National Register of Historic Places in Missouri
Gothic Revival church buildings in Missouri
Churches completed in 1887
19th-century Episcopal church buildings
Religious organizations established in 1857
Episcopal church buildings in Missouri
Churches in Kansas City, Missouri
1857 establishments in Missouri
Anglo-Catholic church buildings in the United States
National Register of Historic Places in Kansas City, Missouri